Hussein Abdel-Latif, is a former Egyptian professional footballer.

Honours

Zamalek
Egyptian Premier League: 2
 1991–92, 1992–93
African Cup of Champions Clubs: 2
 1993, 1996
CAF Super Cup: 2
1994, 1997

References

Zamalek SC players
Egyptian footballers
Al Aluminium SC managers
Egyptian Premier League players
Association football defenders
Egyptian football managers
1965 births
Living people